I Hope You Dance is the third studio album by American country music singer Lee Ann Womack. It was released on May 23, 2000, as her first album for MCA Nashville. The title track was a crossover hit in 2000, becoming Womack's only number one single on the Billboard Hot Country Songs chart, while "Ashes by Now", "Why They Call It Falling", and "Does My Ring Burn Your Finger" also peaked in the top 40 region of that chart.

Background
Womack told Billboard: "Frank [Liddell] doesn't look for hits; he looks for great songs. He's into making albums, not hit singles. So hopefully what people will see with this project is that it is an album. There are a lot of great songs on there that won't even be singles. You've got to listen to the album to get them." She also stated, "I'm very, very glad I spent that time and didn't come right back out with a new album right after Decca closed. I didn't rush in to make an album. We took a lot of time. I wanted to get it right. It's different for each person, but I think because I did take the time and the care to take care of both of those things as best I could, I feel like some good things are coming in the future."

Content
The first single release from the album was the title track. Featuring guest vocals from then-labelmates Sons of the Desert, "I Hope You Dance" became Womack's only number one single on the Billboard Hot Country Songs chart. This song was also a crossover hit, topping the Adult Contemporary charts and reaching #14 on the Billboard Hot 100.

After that song came "Ashes by Now", a cover of a song which was previously a #37 pop hit for Rodney Crowell in 1980. Womack's rendition reached #4 on the country charts and #45 on the pop charts. "Why They Call It Falling" was the album's third single, with a #13 country and #78 pop peak. The #23 country hit "Does My Ring Burn Your Finger", written by Buddy and Julie Miller, was the album's last single release.

"I Feel Like I'm Forgetting Something" is the only track on the album that Womack co-wrote, doing so with ex-husband Jason Sellers and Wynn Varble. "Lord, I Hope This Day Is Good" was originally a number one country hit for Don Williams in 1981.

Reception

Mario Tarradell of The Dallas Morning News gave the album an A rating and wrote, "On I Hope You Dance Ms. Womack digs deeper into the heart and soul of country with an album that honours and challenges the genre. She does it with no fanfare. For her, artistry is about timeless songs and potent messages. This is an album rooted in steel guitars and fiddles without sounding retro. Ms. Womack is recording country music for the next century, not from the last one. Good country music is supposed to put everyday highs and lows in melodic perspective. I Hope You Dance does just that." Tarradel also listed it as the number one album of 2000 and wrote, "Ms. Womack made an album from the soul that just happened to work on mainstream country radio. From the gorgeous title track to the tough-yet-tender ache in her Appalachian soprano, this is country music good enough to stand beside the legendary work of the genre's icons." Geoffrey Himes of The Washington Post listed the album as the seventh best album of 2000 and he wrote, "Just when you thought mainstream country was hopelessly bankrupt, along comes this diminutive singer with the immense voice, bringing genuine class to the "Forever Young"-like title-track smash and lending some universality to such alt-country writers as Bruce Robison, Rodney Crowell, and Buddy and Julie Miller. Womack is the new Emmylou Harris."

Greg Quill of The Toronto Star said, "Her new CD I Hope You Dance is a spectacular collection of some of the finest story-songs recently crafted in the country and country folk areas, from veteran hit writers Mark D. Sanders' and Tia Sillers' title track – an achingly uplifting song of hope and goodwill – and country staples, Rodney Crowell's "Ashes By Now" and Ronnie Bowman's "The Healing Kind," to the dark and almost perverse offerings of alt-country icon Buddy Miller's "Does My Ring Burn Your Finger?" Editors at Billboard gave the album a positive review and wrote, From the opening fiddle strains on "The Healing Kind" to the cautious optimism of "Lord I Hope This Day Is Good" 11 tracks later, this is an emotional tour de force and one great country record. Womack's voice is a wonder, and here she makes use of some of Nashville's best writers. Beyond the career-defining title track, this is, without question, a career-defining album-one that should push Womack into the big leagues for good. Ralph Novak of People wrote, "With its rueful tone, evocative songs and emotion-drenched, sweet-voiced vocals, this could have been mistaken for a Dolly Parton album. Who would have guessed it's the erstwhile Texas firebrand Womack in a new mode less suited to honky-tonks than to wedding receptions." Richard Corliss of Time wrote, "Womack's work on this solid set suggests that she's too good for a future in the lounges. She should be playing main rooms for ages to come." Editors at The Straits Times wrote, "No matter how much vocal support she gets, it's her powerhouse voice that rings true. I Hope You Can Dance is a rarity among the current crop of country albums, one that combines the musical sincerity of country heartland with a modern slur without making a wrong turn." Robert Christgau gave the album a two-star honourable mention rating, which corresponds to "a likeable effort consumers attuned to its overriding aesthetic or individual vision may well enjoy."

Track listing
Tracks 13 and 14 are only included on the Japanese release with serial number UICC-1029.

Personnel
As listed in liner notes.

Sam Bacco – percussion
Brett Beavers – bass guitar
Richard Bennett – electric guitar, bouzouki
Ronnie Bowman – background vocals
Bekka Bramlett – background vocals
Mark Casstevens – gut string guitar
Lisa Cochran – background vocals
Chad Cromwell – drums
Rusty Danmyer – Dobro
Eric Darken – percussion
Dave Dunsearth – drums
Mark Fain – bass guitar
Tabitha Fair – background vocals
Pat Flynn – acoustic guitar
Larry Franklin – fiddle, mandolin
Paul Franklin – steel guitar, Dobro, slide guitar
Kenny Greenberg – electric guitar
Aubrey Haynie – fiddle
John Johnson – mandolin
Marabeth Jordan – background vocals
Liana Manis – background vocals
Joe Manual – acoustic guitar
Brent Mason – electric guitar
Buddy Miller – background vocals
Gene Miller – background vocals
Julie Miller – background vocals
Kevin Montgomery – background vocals
Steve Nathan – keyboards, Hammond B-3 organ, synthesizer
Michael Omartian – accordion
Jon Randall – background vocals
Michael Rhodes – bass guitar
Jeff Roach – synthesizer, Wurlitzer electric piano
Jason Sellers – background vocals
Lisa Silver – background vocals
Ricky Skaggs – background vocals
Dan Tyminski – acoustic guitar
Bergen White – background vocals
Lonnie Wilson – drums
Drew Womack – background vocals on "I Hope You Dance"
Lee Ann Womack – lead vocals
Tim Womack – background vocals on "I Hope You Dance"
Glenn Worf – bass guitar
Doug Virden – background vocals on "I Hope You Dance"

Strings conducted and arranged by David Campbell, performed by the Nashville String Machine.

Chart performance
The album sold 76,000 copies during its first week.

Weekly charts

Year-end charts

References

2000 albums
MCA Records albums
Lee Ann Womack albums
Albums arranged by David Campbell (composer)
Albums produced by Mark Wright (record producer)